Dr. Bhupendra Nath Dutta Smriti Mahavidyalaya, established in 1996, is the general degree college in Hatgobindapur, Purba Bardhaman district. It offers undergraduate courses in arts, commerce and sciences. It is affiliated to  University of Burdwan.

Departments

Science

Chemistry
Mathematics
Zoology
Botany
Nutrition
Computer Application

Arts and Commerce

Bengali
English
Sanskrit
Philosophy
History
Geography
Political Science
Mass Communication & Journalism
Music
Commerce
Physical Education

Accreditation
The college is recognized by the University Grants Commission (UGC).

See also

References

External links
Dr. Bhupendra Nath Dutta Smriti Mahavidyalaya

Universities and colleges in Purba Bardhaman district
Colleges affiliated to University of Burdwan
Educational institutions established in 1996
1996 establishments in West Bengal